2MT was the first British radio station to make regular entertainment broadcasts.

2MT may also refer to:

 Various railway locomotives, including:
 LMS Ivatt Class 2 2-6-0
 LMS Ivatt Class 2 2-6-2T
 BR Standard Class 2 2-6-0
 BR Standard Class 2 2-6-2T